Lukovo is a village in Svoge Municipality, Sofia Province, in western Bulgaria.

Lukovo Point in Antarctica is named after the village.

References

Villages in Sofia Province